Eurasimona fedotovae is a species of tephritid or fruit flies in the genus Eurasimona of the family Tephritidae.

References

Tephritinae